The 1954 Morpeth by-election was held on 4 November 1954.  The by-election was triggered by the death on 19 July of the incumbent Labour MP, Robert Taylor.  The by-election was won by the Labour candidate Will Owen.

References

By-elections to the Parliament of the United Kingdom in Northumberland constituencies
1954 elections in the United Kingdom
1954 in England
20th century in Northumberland
Morpeth, Northumberland